Tasciovanus (died c. 9 AD) was a historical king of the Catuvellauni tribe before the Roman conquest of Britain.

History

Tasciovanus is known only through numismatic evidence. He appears to have become king of the Catuvellauni c. 20 BC, ruling from Verlamion (the site of modern-day St Albans).  He is believed to have moved the tribal capital to that site from an earlier settlement, near modern-day Wheathampstead.  For a brief period c. 15–10 BC, he issued coins from Camulodunum (Colchester), apparently supplanting Addedomarus of the Trinovantes. After this, he once again issued his coins from Verlamion, now bearing the legend RICON, for *Rigonos, Common Brittonic for "great/divine/legitimate king". Some of his coins bear other abbreviated names such as "DIAS", "SEGO" and "ANDOCO": these are generally considered to be the names of co-rulers or subordinate kings, but may instead be mint-marks. He died c. AD 9, succeeded by his son Cunobeline, who ruled primarily from Camulodunum. Another son, Epaticcus, expanded his territory westwards into the lands of the Atrebates.

Medieval traditions

A genealogy preserved in the medieval Welsh manuscript British Library Harley MS 3859 (see Harleian genealogies) contains three generations which read "Caratauc map Cinbelin map Teuhant". This is the equivalent of "Caratacus, son of Cunobelinus, son of Tasciovanus", putting the three historical figures in the correct order, although the wrong historical context, the degree of linguistic change suggesting a long period of oral transmission. The remainder of the genealogy contains the names of a sequence of Roman emperors, and two Welsh mythological figures, Guidgen (Gwydion) and Lou (Lleu).

He appears in Geoffrey of Monmouth's Historia Regum Britanniae (1136) as the legendary king Tenvantius, son of Lud. When his father died, he and his older brother Androgeus were still minors, so the kingship of Britain was given to their uncle Cassibelanus. Tenvantius was made Duke of Cornwall and participated in his uncle's defence of Britain against Julius Caesar. Androgeus went to Rome with Caesar, so when Cassibelanus died, Tenvantius succeeded him as king. He was in turn succeeded by his son Kimbelinus (Cunobeline), who had been brought up at the court of Augustus.

In Middle Welsh versions of Geoffrey's Historia, his name appears as Teneufan and Trahayant.

Under the name of Tenewan ap Lludd (Geoffrey of Monmouth's Tenvantius Welshified), he is claimed as a paternal ancestor in the Mostyn Ms. 117 by the Mathrafal Dynasty (The Lleision Tribal Princes) and therefore subsequently the Kings of Rhwng Gwy Y Hafren (The Iorwerthion Tribal Princes) also.

References

External links
Catuvellauni at  Roman-Britain.co.uk 
Catuvellauni at Romans in Britain
http://www.ancienttexts.org/library/celtic/ctexts/mostyn117.html

0s deaths
Year of death uncertain
Year of birth unknown
Briton rulers
Traditional history of Julius Caesar's invasions of Britain
Briton kings involved in Julius Caesar's invasions of Britain
1st-century BC rulers in Europe